Robert's Western World is a honky tonk located in Nashville, Tennessee. It has hosted and continues to host many big name country artists. Some of the famous artists that have passed through Robert's Western World's doors are Big Ben Keith of Crosby, Stills, and Nash; Don Warden,  Dolly Parton's manager; and many, many others, including: Billy Robinson, Lloyd Green, Smiley Roberts, Jack Boles, Ron Elliot, Curly Chalker, Don Helms, Andy Gibson and Chris Casello. 

Robert's Western World continues to host local and up and coming country music talent. The band BR549 which gained local and national press from its four-hour nightly gig at Robert's Western World went on to open for country greats, George Strait, Faith Hill and Tim McGraw. Despite these accomplishments, the band never made it big with the mainstream country audience. However, BR549 released an album in 1996 titled "Live From Robert's" which was a compilation of original work as well as cover songs recorded in Robert's Western World.

On October 15, 2010, Robert's Western World hosted the "Bluegrass on Broadway" presented by C. F. Martin & Company, this kicked off the annual International Bluegrass Music Association in Nashville.  This event showcases bluegrass music and its artists to the public.

History
The building that houses Robert's Western World was used as a warehouse, office space for river merchants, and a variety of other purposes until the late 1950s. Steel guitar players Shot Jackson and Buddy Emmons bought the venue and named it Sho-Bud Steel Guitar Company. The steel guitar shop manufactured and sold steel guitars and other musical instruments until the early 1980s. When lower Broadway hit on hard times the building was converted to a liquor store until Robert Moore bought and converted the building into a western apparel store named Robert's Rhinestone Western Wear. After the lower Broadway area rebounded, Mr. Moore added live entertainment, food, and alcohol. In the 90's, Robert's house band BR549 graced the stage and helped revitalize the lower broadway district. 

In 1999, Jesse Lee Jones bought Robert's from Robert Moore and has been dedicated to preserving the title "the home of traditional country music" on lower broadway. As of 2011 Jones's band Brazilbilly plays Friday and Saturday nights as the house band.

References

External links
 http://robertswesternworld.com/
 http://www.guitargearheads.com/modules/news/article.php?storyid=1482

Buildings and structures in Nashville, Tennessee
American country music
Culture of Nashville, Tennessee
Tourist attractions in Nashville, Tennessee
Music venues in Tennessee
Honky-tonks